Vladimir Vasilevich Kirpichnikov (7 July 1903 – 10 October 1950) was a Soviet general of the Red Army. During World War II he served as commander of 43rd Rifle Division. Kirpichnikov was the only Soviet general captured by the Finnish Army.

Early life 
Kirpichnikov graduated from the Ulyanovsk Infantry Military Academy in 1925. He served as a platoon leader and later as a major and a colonel in the 11th Rifle Division in Leningrad Military District. In 1937 Kirpichnikov served as chief of staff in the Spanish Civil War and was awarded the Order of the Red Star. He was named commander of the 43rd Rifle Division in 1939. In the Winter War Kirpichnikov was awarded with the Order of the Red Banner. After the war he studied at the Frunze Military Academy.

World War II 
Kirpichnikov was captured by the Finns at the Battle of Porlampi on 1 September 1941. He was first interrogated in the village of Karisalmi and later moved to Finnish Army headquarters in Mikkeli. The Finns wanted to use Kirpichnikov for propagandist purposes since they knew he had some opinions that were critical of the Soviet regime. However, Kirpichnikov did not agree to work for the Finns. In December 1941 he was moved to Sotavankileiri 1 (Prison camp 1), which was located in the municipality of Köyliö in Western Finland. It was a camp for more than 3,000 Soviet prisoners, including 1,000 officers. 

According to other prisoners, Kirpichnikov was offered the commander's post of the Russian Liberation Army but he refused. The pictures taken of Kirpichnikov were used as a propaganda tool. Most famous are a picture of Kirpichnikov lighting the cigarette of his interrogator, General Lennart Oesch, and a color photo of Kirpichnikov with a newspaper and a pack of Chesterfield cigarettes. He was seen in the Finnish propaganda newsreel Puolustusvoimain katsaus 11 in 1941.

Execution 
After the war was over, Kirpichnikov was sent back to the Soviet Union where he was immediately arrested by the SMERSH. Kirpichnikov was held in a prison camp in Podolsk, then later at Lefortovo Prison in Moscow. He was charged with treason and sentenced to death by the USSR Military Collegium on 8 October 1950. Two days later, Kirpichnikov was shot. Some sources report the date of his execution as 28 August 1950, prior to the recorded death sentence.

Awards and decorations
Soviet Union

Gallery

References 

 
1903 births
1950 deaths
People from Ulyanovsk
People from Simbirsky Uyezd
Communist Party of the Soviet Union members
Soviet major generals
Soviet people of the Spanish Civil War
Soviet military personnel of the Winter War
Soviet military personnel of World War II
Soviet prisoners of war
World War II prisoners of war held by Finland
Recipients of the Order of the Red Banner
People executed for treason against the Soviet Union
People from Ulyanovsk Oblast
Executed Soviet people from Russia
Russian people executed by the Soviet Union
Executed military leaders